Caminata is a town and former comune (municipality) in the Province of Piacenza in the Italian region Emilia-Romagna, located about  northwest of Bologna and about  southwest of Piacenza. It is now part of the comune of Alta Val Tidone.

External links

 

Cities and towns in Emilia-Romagna